The modiolus is a conical shaped central axis in the cochlea. The modiolus consists of spongy bone and the cochlea turns approximately 2.75 times around the central axis in humans. The cochlear nerve, as well as spiral ganglion is situated inside it. The cochlear nerve conducts impulses from the receptors located within the cochlea.

The picture shows the osseous labyrinth. The modiolus is not labeled; it's at the axis of the spiral of the cochlea.

References

External links
 http://www.univ-brest.fr/S_Commun/Biblio/ANATOMIE/Web_anat/Tete_Cou/Oreille/Modiolus.jpg
 http://www.kumc.edu/instruction/medicine/anatomy/histoweb/eye_ear/ear01.htm

Ear